Maria Victoria "Vicki" Gonzalez Belo-Kho (born January 25, 1956) is a Filipina doctor and television personality. She is the founder, CEO, and medical director of Belo Medical Group. Notably, she did not undergo the required 3 years of residency training under a certified institution, therefore, is not a board-certified dermatologist of the Philippine Dermatological Society, the only specialty society in Dermatology recognized by the Philippine Medical Association and the Philippine College of Physicians.

Early life and education 
Maria Victoria Gonzalez Belo was born January 25, 1956. She attended Assumption College San Lorenzo for her secondary education. She earned a Bachelor of Science from the University of the Philippines, Diliman and completed her degree of Medicine and Surgery at the University of Santo Tomas. She obtained a ten-month Diploma in Dermatology from the Institute of Dermatology in Bangkok, Thailand. Dr. Belo furthered her studies in Dermatologic and Laser Surgery in California, Harvard Medical School in Boston, Massachusetts, and at St. Francis Memorial Hospital in the University of California at San Francisco.

Career
Belo is a speaker and guest lecturer in several organizations in the Philippines and abroad, such as the International Society of Cosmetic Laser Surgeons in Washington, D.C.; the American Society of Dermatologic Surgery in Portland, Oregon; the World Congress on Liposuction Surgery in Pasadena, California; the American Academy of Cosmetic Surgery; and the International Farmstead Convention on Intense Pulsed Light Therapy (Quantum SR): Asian Experience in Frankfurt, Germany and United States of America.

Belo is a member of the following organizations: American Society of Dermatologic Surgery (ASDS), American Academy of Cosmetic Surgery (AACS), American Society for Laser Medicine and Surgery (ASLMS), American Academy of Anti-Aging Medicine (A4M), International Society of Cosmetic Laser Surgeons (ISCLS), International Society of Dermatologic Surgery (ISDS), and Philippine Society of Liposuction Surgery.

Belo is also an active proponent of Philippine medical tourism. She is the founding officer for The Philippine National Society of Liposuction Surgery.

Belo Medical Group 
Belo is the CEO and medical director of the Belo Medical Group, which owns and operates 15 medical clinics in Metro Manila, Cebu, and Davao. The Belo Medical Group is the first accredited ambulatory cosmetic surgi-centre in the Philippines, certified by the Philippine Department of Health (DOH) and endorsed by the Philippine Department of Tourism (DOT). In 2013, Belo Medical Group became the first ambulatory clinic in the country to have been given international accreditation by the National Accreditation Board of Hospitals and Healthcare Providers (NABH). Their accreditation was renewed in 2016. It remains the only clinic in the Philippines to have received such recognition.

Filmography 
 Boy Pick-Up: The Movie (2012)
 Sosy Problems (2012)
 Kung Fu Divas (2013)
 Beauty in a Bottle (2014) as herself
 The Last Pinoy Action King (2015)

Personal life 
Belo is known for being associated both professionally and personally with many Filipino celebrities and politicians. She divorced businessman and NU 107 founder Atom Henares. Quark Henares, film and music video director, and Cristalle Henares-Pitt, managing director of Belo Medical Group, are their two children. She is the adopted daughter of former Philippine Congressman and 1971 Philippine Constitutional Convention delegate Enrique Belo. She was engaged to her longtime boyfriend Hayden Kho in 2011, and were married in Paris in 2017. In May 2016, Belo and Kho introduced their daughter, Scarlet Snow Belo.

References

External links
 Vicki Belo, Hayden Kho to wed in September
 Vicki Belo clarifies Scarlet Snow is her biological daughter with Hayden Kho
 More details about Scarlet Snow

University of Santo Tomas alumni
University of the Philippines Diliman alumni
Harvard Medical School alumni
1956 births
Living people
Filipino adoptees
Filipino dermatologists
Filipino people of Chinese descent
Filipino people of Spanish descent
Filipino television personalities
People from Capiz
Visayan people
Filipino women medical doctors
20th-century Filipino medical doctors
21st-century Filipino medical doctors
20th-century American women physicians
20th-century American physicians
21st-century American women physicians
21st-century American physicians